Maxine Eve Pimentel Eigenmann (born September 29, 1987), also known as Max Eigenmann, is a Filipino actress and singer.

Personal life 

Eigenmann is the daughter of actor Mark Gil and former beauty queen-turned-actress Bing Pimentel. Her brother is Sid Lucero. Through her father, she is a half-sister to Andi Eigenmann, Gabby Eigenmann and Ira Eigenmann.

She has two children: Massi, with businessman and ex-partner Norman Crisologo, and Sandro.

Filmography

Television

Film

Awards and nominations

Notes

References

External links 
 

Living people
Filipino film actresses
1987 births
Asia Pacific Screen Award winners
Filipino television actresses